Miguel Patiño Velázquez (30 September 1938 – 22 September 2019) was a Mexican Roman Catholic bishop.

Patiño Velázquez was born in Mexico and was ordained to the priesthood in 1963. He served as bishop of the Roman Catholic Diocese of Apatzingán, Mexico, from 1981 to 2014.

Notes

1938 births
2019 deaths
20th-century Roman Catholic bishops in Mexico
21st-century Roman Catholic bishops in Mexico